Trisomie 21 is a French cold wave group, formed in Lille, France, in 1980 by brothers Philippe and Hervé Lomprez.

History 

Throughout the 1980s and '90s, Trisomie 21 was signed to Play It Again Sam.

In September 2007, Trisomie 21 were signed to Belgian label Alfa Matrix where they joined acts such as Front 242, Leaether Strip, Anne Clark and Mentallo and the Fixer.

Discography 

 Studio albums

 Passions Divisées (1984)
 Chapter IV – Le Je-Ne-Sais-Quoi Et Le Presque Rien (1986)
 Million Lights – A Collection of Songs by Trisomie 21 (1987)
 T21 Plays the Pictures (1989)
 Works (1989)
 Raw Material. (1990)
 Distant Voices (1992)
 Gohohako (1997)
 Happy Mystery Child (2004)
 Black Label (2009)
 ELEGANCE NEVER DIES (2017)

 EPs

 Le Repos Des Enfants Heureux (1983)
 Wait & Dance (1985)
 Final Work (1989)

 Remix albums/EPs

 Chapter IV Remix – Le Je-Ne-Sais-Quoi Et Le Presque Rien (1987)
 The Man Is a Mix (2004)
 The Woman Is a Mix (2006)
 Happy Mystery Club – Lady B Remixes (2006)
 3700426905961 (EP; 2008)
 The Camp – Black Label Remix (2009)
 Happy E.N.D. (2018)

 Live albums

 The Official Bootlet (Million Lights Tour) (1988)
 Rendez-vous En France (2007)

 Compilation albums

 The First Songs (1988)
 Side by Side (1991)
 The Songs by T21 Vol. 1 (1994)
 The Songs by T21 Vol. 2 (1995)
 25 Years (2007)

 Singles

 "Joh Burg" (1986)
 "Shift Away ° Jakarta ° Ravishing Delight" (1987)
 "Works in Progress" (1989)
 "La Fete Triste" (1995)
 "Red or Green (Remixes)" (2005)
 "Midnight of My Life (Remixes)" (2005)
 "Red or Green / She Died for Love" (2005)

References

External links 

 
 
 
  Trisomie 21 biography at Trouser Press's official website

Musical groups from Hauts-de-France
Family musical groups
Cold wave groups
French dark wave musical groups
French post-punk music groups